The 2005–06 Scottish Football League Third Division was the 11th season in the format of ten teams in the fourth-tier of Scottish football. The season started on 6 August 2005 and ended on 29 April 2006. Cowdenbeath finished top and were directly promoted to the 2006–07 Scottish Second Division.

The 2005–06 season saw the introduction of the play-offs in which the ninth placed team of the Scottish Second Division would enter and knock-out tournament with the teams ranked second, third and fourth in the Scottish Third Division. Berwick Rangers, Stenhousemuir and Arbroath entered the play-offs against Alloa Athletic of the Second Division, who emerged play-off winners and avoided relegation.

Teams for 2005–06

Gretna as champions of the 2004–05 season were directly promoted to the 2005–06 Scottish Second Division alongside Peterhead who finished second. They were replaced by Berwick Rangers, who finished bottom of the 2004–05 Scottish Second Division, and Arbroath respectively.

Overview
Relegated from Second Division to Third Division
 Berwick Rangers
 Arbroath

Promoted from Third Division to Second Division
 Gretna
 Peterhead

Stadia and attendances

Table

Top scorers

References

Scottish Third Division seasons
3
4
Scot